Canoe World Cup refers to a number of events organized by the International Canoe Federation (ICF) across several disciplines: 1) Canoe Sprint World Cup, 2) Canoe Slalom World Cup, 3) Wildwater Canoeing World Cup and 4) Canoe Freestyle World Cup.

The sub-disciplines were single canoe (C1), double canoe (C2), single kayak (K1) and squirt boating.

Canoe Sprint World Cup

Men

Women

Canoe Slalom World Cup

Wildwater Canoeing World Cup

Canoe Freestyle World Cup

Men

Women

References 

Canoeing
Canoe sprint
Canoeing and kayaking competitions